Trader Jack may refer to:

Jack McCloskey (1925–2017), American basketball executive
Jack McKeon (born 1930), American baseball manager and executive